St. Peter's Catholic Church  is a site on the National Register of Historic Places located in Wibaux, Montana.  It was added to the Register on March 14, 1990.

Description
An inscription on the original stained glass window in the sacristy reads: "Through the generosity of Pierre Wibaux this church was dedicated to St. Peter in 1895."

For the centennial celebration of the Roman Catholic Diocese of Great Falls-Billings in 2004, a photo catalogue of parishes was published, containing comments about the old St. Peter's Church.

Several years later the building ceased to be used for catechesis, and the nave and sanctuary have since been restored to their original form. Those who wish to visit the interior may contact the Wibaux Historical Society.

References

Churches on the National Register of Historic Places in Montana
Roman Catholic churches completed in 1895
Roman Catholic Diocese of Great Falls–Billings
Roman Catholic churches in Montana
National Register of Historic Places in Wibaux County, Montana
19th-century Roman Catholic church buildings in the United States